The Treasure Coast is a region in the southeast of the U.S. state of Florida. It borders the Atlantic Ocean and comprises Indian River, Martin, and St. Lucie Counties. The region, whose name refers to the Spanish Treasure Fleet that was lost in a 1715 hurricane, evidently emerged from residents' desire to distinguish themselves from the Gold Coast to the south (the coast along Palm Beach, Broward, and Miami-Dade counties).

The Treasure Coast area includes parts of two metropolitan statistical areas designated by the Office of Management and Budget and used for statistical purposes by the Census Bureau and other agencies: the Port St. Lucie Metropolitan Statistical Area (comprising St. Lucie and Martin counties) and the Sebastian–Vero Beach, Florida Metropolitan Statistical Area (comprising Indian River County).

History
The area has long been inhabited, but like other of Florida's vernacular regions, a popular identity for the area did not emerge until the area saw its initial population boom in the 20th century. It is one of several "coast" regions in Florida, like the Gold Coast and the First Coast. The term was coined by John J. Schumann Jr. and Harry J. Schultz of the Vero Beach Press Journal newspaper shortly after salvagers began recovering Spanish treasure off the coast in 1961. The discovery of treasure from the 1715 Treasure Fleet, lost in a hurricane near the Sebastian Inlet, was of major local importance and brought international attention to the area. Press Journal publisher Shumann and editor Schultz noted that there was no name for their area, which was between the well known Gold Coast to the south (From Palm Beach County to Miami) and the Space Coast to the north (Brevard County). They started referring to their region as the "Treasure Coast" in the newspaper, and this use spread to the community.

Media

In Vero Beach the classic hits formatted WQOL broadcasts on 103.7 FM.
In Stuart the country music themed WAVW broadcasts on 92.7 FM.
In Vero Beach there is country music themed WPHR-FM, broadcasting at 94.7 FM. WTTB carries the news talk format, and it broadcasts at 1490 AM and 105.7 FM.
In Fort Pierce there is National Public Radio (NPR) network affiliate WQCS FM, broadcasting at 88.9 FM. It is owned by Indian River State College and carries news, talk and informational programming.  Its positioning statement is "NPR For The Treasure Coast".  It is co-owned with WQCP 91.1 FM in Fort Pierce, which airs a classical music format.

Metropolitan areas

The Treasure Coast includes two metropolitan statistical areas designated by the Office of Management and Budget and used for statistical purposes by the Census Bureau and other agencies. These are:

 The Port St. Lucie, Florida Metropolitan Statistical Area, consisting of Martin and St. Lucie counties. Port St. Lucie is designated as the principal city. The two-county metropolitan statistical area was first defined in 1983 as the Fort Pierce Metropolitan Statistical Area. In 1993, the MSA was renamed the Fort Pierce-Port St. Lucie Metropolitan Statistical Area. In 2006, Fort Pierce was dropped as a principal city and the name was changed to its present form.
 The Sebastian – Vero Beach, Florida Metropolitan Statistical Area, which is coextensive with Indian River County. Sebastian and Vero Beach are designated as the principal cities.

Geography 

All of the Treasure Coast is shielded from the Atlantic Ocean by narrow sandbars and barrier islands that protect the shallow lagoons, rivers, and bays. Immediately inland, pine and palmetto flatlands are abundant. Numerous lakes and rivers run through the Treasure Coast, notably the well known Indian River, a part of the Indian River Lagoon system. At certain seasons of the year, bridges may impede the red drift algae flow, causing a "rotten egg" hydrogen sulfide odor in the area. The Treasure Coast is also bordered by the Atlantic portion of the Intracoastal Waterway, a stretch of closed water from Brownsville, Texas, to Boston, Massachusetts.

Communities
A great amount of the Treasure Coast's population is made up of census-designated places (CDPs), with almost all of these in Martin County and Indian River County. Only one city on the Treasure Coast has a population of more than 100,000 inhabitants, which is Port St. Lucie in St. Lucie County. Here is the classification of the places of the Treasure Coast. C for city, T for town, and V for village.

Place with more than 100,000 inhabitants
Port St. Lucie (principal city) pop. 217,523 C

Places with 10,000 to 50,000 inhabitants
Fort Pierce pop. 43,601 C
Sebastian pop. 23,344 C
Stuart pop. 16,197 C
Vero Beach pop. 16,017 C

Places with 5,000 to 10,000 inhabitants
Fellsmere pop. 5,439 C
Indiantown pop. 6,083 V

Places with 1,000 to 5,000 inhabitants
Indian River Shores pop. 4,075 T
Sewall's Point pop. 2,100 T

Places with fewer than 1,000 inhabitants
St. Lucie Village pop. 604 T

Census-designated places (by population, as of 2010 Census)
Palm City pop. 23,120
Vero Beach South pop. 23,092
Jensen Beach pop. 11,707
Hobe Sound pop. 11,521
Lakewood Park pop. 10,458
Port Salerno pop. 10,091
Gifford pop. 9,590
Fort Pierce North pop. 6,474
Indian River Estates pop. 6,220
River Park pop. 5,222
Fort Pierce South pop. 5,062
White City pop. 3,719
North River Shores pop. 3,101
Roseland pop. 1,472

Transportation infrastructure

Airports
Vero Beach Regional Airport offers commercial passenger service on Breeze Airways. Other commercial airports nearby include Melbourne's Melbourne Orlando International Airport to the north (40 miles from Vero Beach), and West Palm Beach's Palm Beach International Airport to the south (30 miles from Hobe Sound). Other small regional airports in the area include Treasure Coast International Airport in Fort Pierce, and Witham Field in Stuart.

Marine transportation

The Port of Fort Pierce, in Ft. Pierce, located along the Indian River across from the Fort Pierce Inlet, is one of Florida’s fourteen deepwater ports and a locally significant port for imports and exports. The Intracoastal Waterway follows the Indian River as it passes through the Treasure Coast. The Okeechobee Waterway connects Stuart with Ft. Myers on the west coast, passing through Lake Okeechobee approximately halfway along the route.

Highways
Despite its large population, the Treasure Coast has only two major north–south highways running through the area: Florida's Turnpike (a toll road) and Interstate 95. In the southern half of the Treasure Coast, both routes run generally parallel to each other (twice crossing each other), but are mostly located along the extreme western edges of the cities lining the coast. North of Ft. Pierce, the Turnpike leaves the Treasure Coast, heading northwest towards Orlando, leaving 95 as the only north-west highway in the northern half of the area.

Much closer to the coast, U.S. 1 is the only main north–south roadway passing through the cities themselves. Along the western banks of the Indian River, and often on the barrier island for the region (Hutchinson Island and Orchid Island), is Florida State Road A1A.

Beginning in Stuart, Florida State Road 76 runs west out of Stuart, passing Indiantown approximately halfway through before ending at an intersection with U.S. 98/441 in Port Mayaca. Shortly after leaving Stuart, the road parallels the St. Lucie Canal along its southern edge until both terminate along the eastern shore of Lake Okeechobee.

Florida State Road 70 runs east-west, beginning in Ft. Pierce, passing through Okeechobee before terminating in Bradenton,  from Ft. Pierce.

Railroads
The Florida East Coast Railway operates freight service along the coast throughout the region. FEC also operates a rail yard just south of downtown Fort Pierce.

U.S. Sugar's South Central Florida Express, Inc. (SCXF) leases tracks between Pahokee and Fort Pierce from the FEC, known as the Lake Harbor Branch (K Branch). Along with trackage rights into FEC's Fort Pierce Yard, they also have a car haulage arrangement with FEC to Jacksonville to interchange with CSX and Norfolk Southern.

Up until 1963, long-distance passenger trains operated along the route. Among the most notable passenger trains were (main sponsors and destinations) the East Coast Champion (Atlantic Coast Line, New York City); City of Miami (Illinois Central, Chicago); Dixie Flyer (Louisville & Nashville, Chicago); Florida Special (winter season only; Florida East Coast Railway, New York City); Havana Special (Florida East Coast Railway, New York City); South Wind (Louisville & Nashville, Chicago). The Southern Railway's Royal Palm from Cincinnati ended its service south of Jacksonville, along the Florida East Coast by 1958.

Amtrak and the Florida Department of Transportation have been discussing returning passenger service to the coast. In 2018, Brightline, a higher speed train line that will ultimately run between Miami and Orlando, announced that it was looking for sites for a new station between Fort Pierce and Miami. As of November 2019, Stuart is the frontrunner to receive the Brightline station.

References

Further reading 

 
 

 
Coasts of Florida
East Coast of the United States
Regions of Florida
South Florida

Metropolitan areas of Florida
Indian River Lagoon
Indian River County, Florida
Martin County, Florida
St. Lucie County, Florida
Geography of Indian River County, Florida
Geography of Martin County, Florida
Geography of St. Lucie County, Florida
1960s establishments in Florida